Jonathan Richard Norris is an American football coach and former professional player. He served as the head football coach at Oklahoma Panhandle State University in Goodwell, Oklahoma from 1997 to 1999.

A 1985 graduate of American International College, Norris was signed out of college by the New England Patriots where he spent the 1985 NFL season on injured reserve during New England's run through the 1985–86 NFL playoffs and appearance in Super Bowl XX. Norris played as a defensive lineman for the Chicago Bears in 1987.

Head coaching record

References

1962 births
Living people
American football defensive ends
American football defensive tackles
Adams State Grizzlies football coaches
American International Yellow Jackets football players
Chicago Bears players
Oklahoma Panhandle State Aggies football coaches
People from Stratford, Connecticut
National Football League replacement players
Players of American football from Connecticut
Sportspeople from Fairfield County, Connecticut